BZ Bank (legally BZ Bank Aktiengesellschaft) is a Swiss private bank primarily active in stock transactions. It specializes in stock trading, wealth management, stock and investment consulting, collective joint-ventures and corporate advisory. As a result of this specialization, BZ Bank's main income segment is the commission and service business. As of the 2021 balance sheet date, assets under management were CHF 13.2 billion.

History 
BZ Bank was founded in 1985 by Martin Ebner in Zürich, Switzerland under the name BZ Bank Zürich Aktiengesellschaft. Since the end of 1997, the bank's headquarters are located in Freienbach and offices near Wollerau. In June 2022, Martin Ebner and his wife Rosmarie, who were the majority shareholders of the bank since its founding, sold 70% of their shares to Graubündner Kantonalbank. Thirty percent remained in their private ownership.

External links 

 Website BZ Bank

References 

Banks
Private banks